Angelo Maria Codevilla (May 25, 1943 – September 20, 2021) was an Italian-American professor of international relations at what is now the Pardee School of Global Studies at Boston University. He served as a U.S. Navy officer, a foreign service officer, and professional staff member of the Select Committee on Intelligence of the United States Senate. Codevilla's books and articles range from French and Italian politics to the thoughts of Machiavelli and Montesquieu to arms control, war, the technology of ballistic missile defenses, and a broad range of international topics. Articles by Codevilla have appeared in Commentary, Foreign Affairs, National Review, and The New Republic. His op-eds have appeared in The New York Times, The Wall Street Journal, The American Spectator and The Washington Post.  He has also been published in Political Science Reviewer, Intercollegiate Review, and Politica.

Education and career
He graduated from Rutgers University in 1965, having studied natural sciences, languages, and politics.  After receiving a Ph.D. in 1973 from Claremont Graduate School, Codevilla began to teach political science. In 1977 he joined the U.S. Foreign Service but quickly moved to Capitol Hill, where he served on the staff of the U.S. Senate Select Committee on Intelligence. He helped to conceive the technology programs that, in 1983, were relabeled the Strategic Defense Initiative. Between 1977 and 1985 he was on the staff of the Senate Select Committee on Intelligence.  He was an aide to Senator Malcolm Wallop, serving on the staff of the Senate Select Committee on Intelligence 1977–1985. Meanwhile, he taught political philosophy at Georgetown University, and was a principal on Presidential transition teams for the Department of State and the Central Intelligence Agency. In 1980 Codevilla was appointed to the teams preparing the presidential transition for the State Department and the CIA. Throughout his time in government, Codevilla published on intelligence and national security and taught. In 1985 Codevilla returned to full-time academic life as a senior research fellow at the Hoover Institution, Stanford University. He was professor of international relations at what is now the Pardee School of Global Studies at Boston University from 1995 to 2008.

Personal life
Angelo Maria Codevilla was born on May 25, 1943, in Voghera, Italy, son of Angelo (a businessman) and Serena (Almangano) Codevilla.  He emigrated to the United States in 1955, and became a US citizen in 1962. He married Ann Marie Blaesser on December 31, 1966. His children are David, Peter, Michael, Elizabeth, and Thomas. He served in the U.S. Naval Reserve 1969–1971, leaving active duty as a lieutenant, junior grade. He received the Joint Service Commendation Medal. Codevilla died in a car accident in Tracy, California, on September 20, 2021, at the age of 78.

Pollard case
He publicly objected to the sentence of spy Jonathan Pollard on procedural and substantive grounds while acknowledging his guilt of espionage.

On November 5, 2013, he personally wrote a letter about Pollard to President Obama. He stated, "Others have pointed out that Pollard is the only person ever sentenced to life imprisonment for passing information to an ally, without intent to harm America, a crime which normally carries a sentence of two to four years; and that this disproportionate sentence in violation of a plea agreement was based not on the indictment but on a memorandum that was never shared with the defense.  This is not how American Justice is supposed to work." He continues to state that his plea like DCI James Woolsey, former Attorney general Michael Mukasey, and former Senator Dennis DeConcini are based on his thorough knowledge of the case. Codevilla concludes that "having been intimately acquainted with the materials that Pollard passed and with the "sources and methods" by which they were gathered, I would be willing to give expert testimony that Pollard is guilty of neither more nor less than what the indictment alleges."

In an interview to the Weekly Standard, Codevilla stated, "The story of the Pollard case is a blot on American justice," The life sentence "makes you ashamed to be an American."

Selected publications
Articles
Codevilla, Angelo M. (2019). "European Defense". Hoover Institution. https://www.hoover.org/research/european-defense
Codevilla, Angelo M. (2016). "The Rise of Political Correctness". The Independent Institute. http://www.independent.org/issues/article.asp?id=8932
Codevilla, Angelo M. (2011). "The Lost Decade - Sixteen years after 9/11, America has neither peace nor victory". Claremont Review of Books. Vol. XI, Number 4, Fall 2011 https://claremontreviewofbooks.com/the-lost-decade/

Books

See also
 Soft power
 Smart power
 Missile defense

References

External links
Angelo Codevilla profile, Pardee School, Boston U.
Angelo M. Codevilla C-SPAN index

1943 births
2021 deaths
Boston University faculty
Pardee School of Global Studies faculty
American international relations scholars
Rutgers University alumni
Political philosophers
University of Notre Dame alumni
Claremont Graduate University alumni
United States Navy officers
Grove City College faculty
Georgetown University faculty
American diplomats
Employees of the United States Senate
Italian emigrants to the United States
People from Voghera
Hoover Institution people
Bendix Corporation people
Reagan administration personnel